The obtuse barracuda, Sphyraena obtusata, a barracuda of the family Sphyraenidae, is found in tropical oceans around the world.  Its length is up to 55 cm.

References
 
 Tony Ayling & Geoffrey Cox, Collins Guide to the Sea Fishes of New Zealand,  (William Collins Publishers Ltd, Auckland, New Zealand 1982) 

Sphyraenidae
Fish described in 1829
Taxa named by Georges Cuvier